Watergate is a documentary series co-produced by the BBC and Discovery, broadcast in 1994. It was based on the book Watergate: The Corruption and Fall of Richard Nixon, by Fred Emery. The series was directed by Mick Gold and produced by Paul Mitchell and Norma Percy.

The British version was broadcast on BBC2 from 8 May to 5 June 1994, and narrated by Fred Emery. It was broadcast as five episodes of 50 minutes each. In the United States, the series premiered on August 7, 1994 and was narrated by Daniel Schorr in three parts, with two episodes shown back-to-back for the first two parts.

Episodes
Britain:
Break-in (8 May 1994)
Cover-up (15 May 1994)
Scapegoat (22 May 1994)
Massacre (29 May 1994)
Impeachment (5 June 1994)

USA:
A Third Rate Burglary (7 August 1994)
The Conspiracy Crumbles (14 August 1994)
The Fall of a President (21 August 1994)

Production 
Norma Percy and Brian Lapping pioneered a documentary style of investigating recent international events which involved interviewing senior participants from presidents downwards and succinct editing to juxtapose their eye-witness accounts. Early successes include Breakthrough at Reykjavik in 1987 and The Death of Yugoslavia in 1995. Watergate featured exclusive interviews with many of the key participants in the events, including H. R. Haldeman, John Ehrlichman, John Dean and G. Gordon Liddy as well as former President Gerald Ford.

Percy and Lapping had originally been intrigued by the conspiracy theory that it had been Dean who organised the cover-up, not the Committee for the Re-Election of the President. However, their investigations only served to underline that the truth had already been found; said Percy in an interview with The New York Times in May 1994: "The guilty party wasn't one wayward aide. It was the President of the United States in the White House Oval Office who did it."

Among the frankest of the conspirators interviewed, an unrepentant Liddy had served the longest sentence in jail and so talked explicitly about his role. He was filmed at home while sitting in front of his sizeable collection of firearms, describing "how he had been ready, if ordered, to go straight out and kill Jack Anderson, the Washington D.C. columnist." At one point he was filmed wielding one of his pistols before the TV camera. It was made clear that, at the time of filming, the gun collection was registered in his wife’s name, since he was ineligible for a license.

Following Liddy’s death in 2021, BBC4 started repeating the series on 14 April in the UK.

Reception
Reviewing the series, Jeff Silverman wrote in Variety: "Twenty years after Richard Nixon resigned the presidency in disgrace, this stunningly conceived and realized documentary miniseries brilliantly chronicles the events — and their inevitability — that led to the national nightmare Watergate. Funny, tragic, pathetic and probing, docu dramatically stares down Watergate’s smoking gun and makes its ultimate conclusion perfectly clear: Nixon’s the one. Still. Now more than ever."

Awards 
Watergate won a 1995 News & Documentary Emmy Award for Outstanding Historical Programming.

References

External links
 
  Watergate (TV series) archives at the University of London

1994 British television series debuts
1994 British television series endings
1990s British documentary television series
1994 American television series debuts
1994 American television series endings
1990s American documentary television series
Works about the Watergate scandal
BBC television documentaries
Discovery Channel original programming
English-language television shows